Abdelmoumene Djabou (born 31 January 1987) is an Algerian professional footballer who plays as an attacking midfielder for ES Sétif in the Algerian Ligue Professionnelle 1.

An Algerian international since 2010, Djabou was a member of the Algerian teams at the 2014 FIFA World Cup in Brazil and the 2015 Africa Cup of Nations in Equatorial Guinea. As of March 2015, he has won 12 international caps and scored three goals.

Djabou is Algeria's all-time top scorer at the FIFA World Cup with two goals, a record he shares with Salah Assad and Islam Slimani.

Club career
Djabou came through the junior ranks of his hometown club ES Sétif with the exception of one season with USM Sétif. He made his senior debut during the 2004–05 season, making two league appearances. The following season, he made another two appearances. He spent the 2006–07 season on loan to MC El Eulma.

On 30 September 2008, Djabou was loaned out to Swiss club FC Sion. However, after a month with the club, his paperwork had still not cleared and Djabou returned to ES Sétif.

In January 2009, Djabou was loaned out to USM El Harrach. Djabou made his début for USM El Harrach on 19 February 2009, against NA Hussein Dey coming on as a substitute in the 60th minute for Gharbi. He scored his first goal for the club against his former club MC El Eulma in the 17th minute, with the end result being 2–2. He scored his second goal against RC Kouba in the first minute, with the final result ending at 5–1. He appeared in 12 games and scored two goals during his first loan spell at USM El Harrach. He also spent the 2009–10 season on loan with the club, scoring five goals in 31 appearances. On 9 June 2010, he returned to ES Sétif.

On 13 June 2012, Djabou signed a two-year contract with Tunisian side Club Africain.

International career

On 18 September 2010, Djabou was called up to the Algeria national team by new coach Abdelhak Benchikha for a qualifier against the Central African Republic.

Djabou competed for Algeria at the 2011 African Nations Championship in Sudan, helping the Desert Foxes reach the semi-finals.

He appeared twice during the 2014 FIFA World Cup qualification campaign, and was selected for Algeria's squad for the 2014 FIFA World Cup finals on 2 June 2014. On 22 June, Djabou scored the third goal for Les Fennecs in a 4–2 World Cup group match win against South Korea. He also scored the team's consolation goal in the 120th minute of a 2–1 extra time defeat by Germany in the round of 16.

International goals
Scores and results list Algeria's goal tally first, score column indicates score after each Djabou goal.

Honours
ES Sétif
 Algerian Ligue Professionnelle 1: 2008–09, 2011–12, 2016–17
 Algerian Cup: 2011–12
 Arab Champions League: 2007–08
 North African Cup Winners Cup: 2010
 North African Super Cup: 2010

Club Africain
 Tunisian Ligue Professionnelle 1: 2014–15

References

 ES SÉTIF : ABDELMOUMEN DJABOU EST DE RETOUR‚ africatopsports.com, 8 January 2016

External links
 Elboutoula Profile
 
 Eurosport.fr Profile
 

1987 births
Algerian footballers
Living people
ES Sétif players
USM El Harrach players
Algerian Ligue Professionnelle 1 players
Algeria A' international footballers
Algeria international footballers
Footballers from Sétif
MC El Eulma players
2011 African Nations Championship players
2014 FIFA World Cup players
Algeria youth international footballers
Club Africain players
Algerian expatriate footballers
Algerian expatriate sportspeople in Tunisia
Expatriate footballers in Tunisia
USM Sétif players
2015 Africa Cup of Nations players
Association football midfielders
Algerian expatriate sportspeople in Saudi Arabia
Al Nassr FC players
Saudi Professional League players
Expatriate footballers in Saudi Arabia
21st-century Algerian people